Bob Stevens is a Swedish dansband established in 1958 in Scania, Sweden continuing until the late 1970s. The band was revived under new management in 1987 with new members. In the 1990s, the band released a number of albums that charted on the Svensktoppen chart. Famous singles from the period include "Ett litet under" and cover for "No more Bolero", with Mats Kärrlid on main vocals. After a brief stop in the mid-2000s, is "Bobbarna 're in the process of writing music, touring and recording discs. In 2010s, they returned with albums För bra för att va'sann (2012), Mitt skåne (2014) and Skåne är ett härligt land (2015) that all charted on Sverigetopplistan, the official Swedish Albums chart.

Most recent members of the band are: Mats Kärrlid (main vocals and guitar), Dan Gustafsson (guitar, saxophone and backing vocals), Mats Olsson (saxophone and keyboards) and Micke Langen (drums).

Discography

Albums
1994: Bob Stevens
1996: 2
1998: Samma leende som du
2001: Ljusblåa ögon
2005: Barndomsåren
2008: Här igen!
2010: Bolero

EPs
1989: Räck ut din hand / Nidälven
1990: Månskenskyssen / Gitarr-medley

References

External links
Official website

Musical groups established in 1958
Dansbands
1958 establishments in Sweden